John Henry Humphries ( – ) was a Major League Baseball player who played for the New York Gothams and the Washington Nationals. Despite being left-handed, Humphries played catcher, a position dominated by right-handed players. He also played outfield and first base.  Humphries was the father of the poet Rolfe Humphries, who mentioned him in his poem "Polo Grounds."

Amateur career

College
Humphries attended Cornell University in Ithaca, New York. He was the first player from Cornell to play in Major League Baseball.

Professional career

New York Gothams
At the age of 21, Humphries began his professional career with the New York Gothams. In his first season, Humphries hit .112 with 12 hits, one double and four RBIs in 29 games.

In  Humphries batted only .094 with six hits and two RBIs in 20 games. In his two seasons with the Gothams, Humphries batted .105 with 18 hits, one double and six runs batted in and played in 49 games.

Washington Nationals
Humphries also played for the Washington Nationals in 1884. In 49 games with the Nationals he batted .176 with 23 runs, 34 hits, two doubles and nine walks.

He would continue to play baseball in Minor League Baseball for three seasons after playing for the Nationals. Humphries would also manage two teams in the Minors.

References

External links
Career statistics and player information at Baseball Almanac, Baseball-Reference, Baseball-Reference (Minors)

1861 births
1933 deaths
19th-century baseball players
Baseball people from Ontario
Canadian expatriate baseball players in the United States
Cornell Big Red baseball players
Major League Baseball players from Canada
New York Gothams players
Washington Nationals (AA) players
Sportspeople from Ottawa
Syracuse Stars (baseball)
Toronto Canucks players
Rochester Maroons players
Minor league baseball managers